Graeme MacKenzie (8 March 1935 – 16 September 2016) was an Australian rules footballer who played with Fitzroy in the Victorian Football League.

Notes

External links 

1935 births
2016 deaths
Australian rules footballers from Victoria (Australia)
Fitzroy Football Club players